Victor Soussan (born 28 March 1946 in Casablanca) is an Australian private former Grand Prix motorcycle racer of French Moroccan descent.

Career statistics

By season

References

External links
 Official website
 Profile on motogp.com

1946 births
Living people
Sportspeople from Casablanca
Australian people of Moroccan descent
Australian motorcycle racers
250cc World Championship riders
350cc World Championship riders